Syria competed at the 2000 Summer Paralympics in Sydney, Australia. 4 competitors from Syria won no medals to finish joint 69th in the medal table along with all other countries who failed to win medals.

See also 
 Syria at the Paralympics
 Syria at the 2000 Summer Olympics

References 

Syria at the Paralympics
Nations at the 2000 Summer Paralympics
2000 in Syrian sport